Events in the year 1912 in Norway.

Incumbents
Monarch – Haakon VII
Prime Minister – Jens Bratlie

Events

7 March – Roald Amundsen announced his success in reaching the South Pole
 26 July – Elise Sem was authorized as the first female barrister in Norway
Norsk Hydro established artificial fertilizer production at Glomfjord in Nordland. This activity is today Yara International.
 The 1912 Parliamentary election took place.

Popular culture

Sports

Music

Film

Literature
 The Knut Hamsund novel Den sidste Glæde (The Last Joy, also known as Look Back in Happiness), was published.
 The Olav Duun novel Hilderøya (Hilder Island), Storbåten, was published.

Births
5 January – Karstein Seland, politician (died 2005)
6 January – Thorleif Lintrup Paus, lawyer and diplomat (died 2006)
27 January – Arne Næss, philosopher (died 2009).
27 January – Lars Holen, politician (died 1994)
4 February – Ola Skjåk Bræk, banker, politician and Minister (died 1999)
14 February – Thorvald Wilhelmsen, long-distance runner (died 1996)
14 February – Sigurd Evensmo, author and journalist (died 1978).
17 February – Hans Mikal Solsem, politician (died 1972)
2 April – Eva Haalke, ballet teacher and dancer (died 2003).
8 April – Sonja Henie, figure skater, three time Olympic gold medallist, World Champion and actress (died 1969).
10 April – Sally Olsen, social worker (died 2006).
14 April – Arne Brustad, international soccer player and Olympic bronze medallist (died 1987).
15 April – Henry Karlsen, politician (died 1975)
20 April – Johan A. Vikan, politician (died 1997)
28 April – Øivind Holmsen, international soccer player and Olympic bronze medallist (died 1996).
9 May – Per Imerslund, politician, soldier and writer (died 1943)
19 May – Jens Gunderssen, singer, songwriter, actor, stage producer and theatre director (died 1969)
30 June – Alf Gowart Olsen, shipowner (died 1972).
3 July – Kaare Wahlberg, ski jumper and Olympic bronze medallist (died 1988)
4 July – Sverre Heiberg, photographer (died 1991).
12 July – Eugen Haugland, triple jumper (died 1990)
30 July – Alf Tveten, sailor and Olympic silver medallist (died 1997).
20 August – Birger Hatlebakk, industrialist and politician (died 1997)
9 September – Sam Melberg, sports diver and sports instructor (died 1998).
14 September – Asbjørn Berg-Hansen, boxer (died 1998)
14 September – Johannes Seland, politician (died 1999)
14 September – John Systad, long-distance runner (died 1998)
17 September – David Sandved, architect (died 2001)
21 September – Ragnhild Butenschøn, sculptor (died 1992).
2 October – Bjarne Iversen, cross country skier and Olympic silver medallist (died 1999).
7 October – Trygve Owren, politician (died 1987)
12 October – Arne Arnardo, circus performer and owner (died 1995)
18 October – Anders Skauge, politician (died 2000)
19 October – Arne Arnardo, circus performer and owner (died 1995).
26 October – Birger Breivik, politician (died 1996)
10 November – Ove Skaug, engineer and civil servant (died 2005)
21 November – Magli Elster, poet (died 1993).
9 December – Rolf Wickstrøm, labour activist, executed (died 1941)
12 December – Egil Aarvik, politician (died 1990)
12 December – Thorbjørn Egner, playwright, songwriter and illustrator (died 1990)
12 December – Sverre Walter Rostoft, politician and Minister (died 2001)

Full date unknown
Peter Bastiansen, businessperson and politician (died 1995)
Olav Brunvand, newspaper editor and politician (died 1988)
Hans Engen, journalist, diplomat and politician (died 1966)
Gunvor Galtung Haavik, interpreter charged with espionage (died 1977)
Kåre Jonsborg, painter and textile artist (died 1977)
Harald Wergeland, physicist (died 1987)

Notable deaths

12 February – Gerhard Armauer Hansen, physician (born 1841)
4 July – Emil Stang, jurist, politician and Prime Minister of Norway (born 1834)
23 July – Haldor Boen, teacher and politician in America (born 1851)
1 August – Jens Jonas Jansen, priest (born 1844)
10 August – Jens Carl Peter Brandt, businessperson and politician (born 1848)

Full date unknown
Nils Hansteen, painter (born 1855)
Ebbe Carsten Horneman Hertzberg, politician (born 1847)
Lars Knutson Liestøl, politician and Minister (born 1839)

See also

References

External links

 
Norway
Norway